Januário "Janú" Constâncio Carvalho Silva (born 26 February 1992) is a Portuguese footballer who plays as a forward.

References

External links
 

1992 births
Living people
Sportspeople from Cascais
Association football forwards
Portuguese footballers
FC Tulsa players
USL Championship players
Atlético Clube de Portugal players